Stephen Drury (born April 13, 1955) is an American pianist, conductor and electronic musician.

Drury has performed and recorded a range of compositions by classical and contemporary composers including Igor Stravinsky, Charles Ives, John Cage, Frederic Rzewski, Elliott Carter, and John Zorn. He is the music director of the contemporary music ensemble Callithumpian Consort and teaches at the New England Conservatory of Music.

His CD of Rzewski's The People United Will Never Be Defeated! is considered by critics to be the definitive recording of that work. He has performed with Frederic Rzewski at Carnegie Hall as recently as May 1, 2008.

His CD of Zorn's Carny (John Zorn, Angelus Novus, Tzadik 7028) is also considered by critics to be the definitive recording of that work.

Drury was a student of Margaret Ott, Patricia Zander, and Claudio Arrau.

References

External links

New England Conservatory Faculty Member profile

1955 births
20th-century American conductors (music)
20th-century American male musicians
20th-century American pianists
20th-century classical pianists
21st-century American conductors (music)
21st-century American male musicians
21st-century American pianists
21st-century classical pianists
American classical pianists
American electronic musicians
American male classical pianists
American male conductors (music)
Avant-garde pianists
Living people